Barringtonia revoluta grows as a tree up to  tall, with a trunk diameter of up to . The bark is pale brown. The specific epithet revoluta is from the Latin meaning "rolled back", referring to the leaves. Habitat is forests from sea level to  altitude. B. revoluta is found in Malaysia, Brunei, Indonesia and the Philippines.

References

revoluta
Plants described in 1906
Trees of Sumatra
Trees of Peninsular Malaysia
Trees of Borneo
Trees of the Philippines